Debi Jones (born 1958 in Crosby, Lancashire) is a radio and television broadcaster, journalist, singer, politician and actress. Jones has presented shows for the BBC, Granada Television, BFBS Radio and Radio City. She presenting the afternoon show on BBC Radio Merseyside during the 1980s and then presenting the BBC daytime programme People Today and the magazine show Pebble Mill at One. More recently, Jones has maintained a television career with shopping and holiday channels in the UK.

Jones has also supported the Conservative Party, and served as a councillor in the Manor ward of Crosby. She was the Conservative candidate for Sefton Central at the 2010 UK general election, in which she came second to Labour's Bill Esterson, winning 33.9% of the vote.

Jones has acted on stage and in movies. She played Micky in the film Distant Voices, Still Lives and has starred in pantomimes opposite Ricky Tomlinson at the Epstein Theatre.

In January 2018, it was announced that Jones would join the new radio station Delux Radio, opposite presenters such as Mike Read and Dave Lee Travis.

Personal life 
Jones is married to Steve Jones; they have a daughter, Ruth.

References

External links
 Debi Jones – The Official Website
 Debi Jones at Champions
 

1958 births
Living people
People from Crosby, Merseyside
BBC radio presenters
British radio DJs
English radio presenters
Radio City DJs
Radio presenters from Liverpool
Television presenters from Liverpool
British television personalities
English television presenters
British women singers
British film actresses
British actor-politicians
British broadcaster-politicians
Conservative Party (UK) parliamentary candidates
British women radio presenters